Vincent Clifford 'Cliff' Mansley (5 April 1921 – August 2006) was an English footballer who played for Preston North End, Hamilton, Dumbarton, Queen of the South and Barnsley.

References

1921 births
English footballers
Dumbarton F.C. wartime guest players
Barnsley F.C. players
Queen of the South F.C. wartime guest players
Preston North End F.C. players
English Football League players
Hamilton Academical F.C. wartime guest players
Association football wing halves
2006 deaths